Charles Coles was an American actor and tap dancer.

Charles Coles may also refer to:

Charles Coles (footballer) (1879–1942), Australian rules footballer for Geelong Football Club
Chuck Coles (born 1981), musician
Chuck Coles (baseball) (1931–1996), Major League Baseball left fielder
Charlie Coles (1942–2013), basketball coach

See also
Charles Cole (disambiguation)